is the second CD single by Minori Chihara. The single placed 20th on the Oricon charts after its debut.

Track listing

"Last Arden"

"Last Arden (off vocal)"

References

Minori Chihara songs
Lantis (company) singles
2007 singles
2007 songs